The 2011–12 season was the 78th season in the existence of AS Saint-Étienne and the club's eighth consecutive season in the top flight of French football.

Players

Pre-season and friendlies

Competitions

Overview

Ligue 1

League table

Results summary

Results by round

Matches

Coupe de France

Coupe de la Ligue

References 

AS Saint-Étienne seasons
Saint-Etienne